WNBI-LP (107.9 FM) is a radio station licensed to serve the community of New Buffalo, Michigan. The station is owned by New Buffalo Area Schools, and airs a variety format.

The station was assigned the WNBI-LP call letters by the Federal Communications Commission on September 7, 2015.

References

External links
 Official Website
 FCC Public Inspection File for WNBI-LP
 

NBI-LP
NBI-LP
High school radio stations in the United States
Radio stations established in 2015
2015 establishments in Michigan
Variety radio stations in the United States
Berrien County, Michigan